Hrnčići (Хрнчићи) is a village in the municipality of Bratunac, Bosnia and Herzegovina.

Notable people 

This is the birthplace of Bosniak activist Fata Orlović, who later lived in Konjević Polje near Bratunac.

The islamist Bajro Ikanović is also born in this village.

References

Villages in Republika Srpska
Populated places in Bratunac